Ezra Holmes (1885–1921) was an English professional footballer who scored 12 goals in 43 appearances in the Football League playing for Gainsborough Trinity and Birmingham.

Holmes was born in Wombwell, Yorkshire. A small man who played as a centre forward, his performances for Gainsborough in the Second Division led Birmingham to pay the large fee of £400 for his services in November 1907. He went straight into the starting eleven, played two first-team games, and four months later dropped into non-league football with Stamford Town.

References

1885 births
1921 deaths
Sportspeople from West Bromwich
English footballers
Association football forwards
Gainsborough Trinity F.C. players
Birmingham City F.C. players
Stamford A.F.C. players
English Football League players
Date of birth missing
Date of death missing